Squaw Cap is an unincorporated community in Restigouche County, New Brunswick, Canada.
Squaw Cap has beautiful land covered in lush forests and running brooks.

History

Notable people

See also
List of communities in New Brunswick

References

Communities in Restigouche County, New Brunswick